Hi-Yong Choi (born 1965-09-13 in Korea) is a former professional boxer. He is a former WBA light-flyweight champion.

Professional career 
Choi turned professional in 1987 and captured the WBA light flyweight title in 1991 in only his 10th pro bout in with a decision win over Bong-Jun Kim. He defended the belt 4 times before losing it to Hideyuki Ohashi in 1992. He later moved up in weight and in 1995 captured the WBA light flyweight title with a decision win over Leo Gamez. He lost the belt in 1996 to Carlos Murillo and retired after the bout.

External links 
 

1965 births
Living people
World Boxing Association champions
Light-flyweight boxers
World light-flyweight boxing champions
Mini-flyweight boxers
World mini-flyweight boxing champions
South Korean male boxers